St John Ambulance Northern Ireland (SJANI) is a voluntary organisation based in Northern Ireland. It teaches both adults and children first aid, provides services at public events and prepares first responders what to do in emergencies. It also provides courses for young adults (known as cadets), teaching them what to do in an emergency, as well as teaching communication, recording and observation skills.

The organisation is based in Northern Ireland and is a commandery in the international St John Ambulance movement and is a registered charity under the Charity Commission for Northern Ireland's register.

References

External links

St John Ambulance
First aid organizations